Long-arm jurisdiction is the ability of local courts to exercise jurisdiction over foreign ("foreign" meaning out of jurisdiction, whether a state, province, or nation) defendants, whether on a statutory basis or through a court's inherent jurisdiction (depending on the jurisdiction). This jurisdiction permits a court to hear a case against a defendant and enter a binding judgment against a defendant residing outside the jurisdiction concerned.

At heart, the constraints on long arm jurisdiction are concepts of international law, and the principle that one country ought not exercise state power over the territory of another unless some recognized exception applies. In municipal law, the authority of a court to exercise long-arm jurisdiction must be based upon some action of the defendant which subjects him or her to the jurisdiction of the court.

United States

Jurisprudence

The United States Supreme Court, in International Shoe v. Washington and later on in World-Wide Volkswagen Corp. v. Woodson, has held that a person must have minimum contacts with a State, in order for a court in one state to assert personal jurisdiction over a defendant from another state. As the Court noted in the latter case,

In 1987, the Supreme Court, in its ruling in Asahi Metal Industry Co. v. Superior Court, laid down a five-factor test to determine whether "traditional notions of fair play" would permit the assertion of personal jurisdiction, under the reasonableness requirement, over an out-of-state defendant:

What is the burden on the defendant?
What are the interests of the forum state in the litigation?
What is the interest of the plaintiff in litigating the matter in that state?
Does the allowance of jurisdiction serve interstate efficiency?
Does the allowance of jurisdiction serve interstate policy interests?

There was discussion as to the Court's wisdom in not employing Asahi as a way to articulate "a similarly limited position [as in World-Wide Volkswagen] for the United States within the international community."

The issue of general (as opposed to specific) jurisdiction of US courts was addressed in Helicopteros Nacionales de Colombia, S. A. v. Hall, Goodyear Dunlop Tires Operations, S. A. v. Brown and Daimler AG v. Bauman, where the last held that, outside of "an exceptional case," general jurisdiction will generally be limited to the places where a corporation is incorporated and its principal place of business. In Daimler, Justice Ginsburg noted that specific jurisdiction is supposed to be the norm while "general jurisdiction has come to occupy a less dominant place in the contemporary scene." The risks that a more expansive view of general jurisdiction would pose to international comity were recently dealt with in Kiobel v. Royal Dutch Petroleum Co. and Mohamad v. Palestinian Authority.

Foreign governments

The circumstances by which a foreign government may sue or be sued in federal and state courts are narrowed by the Foreign Sovereign Immunities Act and the Eleventh Amendment to the United States Constitution.

State laws

In the United States, some states' long-arm statutes refer to specific acts, for example torts or contract cases, which a court may entertain. Other states grant jurisdiction more broadly. California's Code of Civil Procedure, for example, states:

New York's Civil Practice Law and Rules has, among other things, asserted the following:

The extent of jurisdiction granted under this authority has expanded in recent jurisprudence of the New York Court of Appeals:

 In June 2006, in Deutsche Bank Securities, Inc. v. Montana Board of Investments, it was held that an out-of-state entity's use of the Bloomberg Messaging System to communicate with a firm based in New York was sufficient to establish jurisdiction.
 In November 2012, in Licci v. Lebanese Canadian Bank, SAL , it was held that a non-U.S. bank’s use of a correspondent account to effect wire transfers on behalf of a non-U.S. client was sufficient to form a basis for personal jurisdiction.

Federal Rules of Civil Procedure 

Rule (k) of the Federal Rules of Civil Procedure provides for where service of a summons outside the district will provide personal jurisdiction over a party.

Canada

The jurisdiction of Canadian courts has been standardized to a great degree through jurisprudence developed by the Supreme Court of Canada, most notably in the 2012 ruling in Club Resorts Ltd. v. Van Breda. It ruled that jurisdiction must be established primarily on the basis of objective factors that connect the legal situation or the subject matter of the litigation with the forum. In a case concerning a tort, the following factors are presumptive connecting factors that, prima facie, entitle a court to assume jurisdiction over a dispute:

 the defendant is domiciled or resident in the province;
 the defendant carries on business in the province;
 the tort was committed in the province; and
 a contract connected with the dispute was made in the province.

It was also held that a Canadian court cannot decline to exercise its jurisdiction unless the defendant invokes forum non conveniens.  The decision to raise this doctrine rests with the parties, not with the court seized of the claim.  If a defendant raises an issue of forum non conveniens, the burden is on him or her to show why the court should decline to exercise its jurisdiction and displace the forum chosen by the plaintiff.

See also
Extraterritoriality
Penguin Group (USA) Inc. v. American Buddha
Universal jurisdiction

References

Jurisdiction
Metaphors referring to body parts